Midson is a surname. Notable people with the surname include:

Charles Midson (1837–1903), Australian builder and politician
Jack Midson (born 1983), English footballer
Nick Midson, member of progressive metal band Threshold

See also
Madson